Analytical jurisprudence is a philosophical approach to law that draws on the resources of modern analytical philosophy to try to understand its nature. Since the boundaries of analytical philosophy are somewhat vague, it is difficult to say how far it extends.  H. L. A. Hart was probably the most influential writer in the modern school of analytical jurisprudence, though its history goes back at least to Jeremy Bentham.

Analytical jurisprudence is not to be mistaken for legal formalism (the idea that legal reasoning is or can be modelled as a mechanical, algorithmic process). Indeed, it was the analytical jurists who first pointed out that legal formalism is fundamentally mistaken as a theory of law.

Analytic, or 'clarificatory' jurisprudence uses a neutral point of view and descriptive language when referring to the aspects of legal systems. This was a philosophical development that rejected natural law's fusing of what law is and what it ought to be. David Hume famously argued in A Treatise of Human Nature that people invariably slip between describing that the world is a certain way to saying therefore we ought to conclude on a particular course of action. But as a matter of pure logic, one cannot conclude that we ought to do something merely because something is the case. So analysing and clarifying the way the world is, must be treated as a strictly separate question to normative and evaluative ought questions.

The most important questions of analytic jurisprudence are: "What are laws?"; "What is the law?"; "What is the relationship between law and power?"; and, "What is the relationship between law and morality?" Legal positivism is the dominant theory, although there are a growing number of critics, who offer their own interpretations.

See also
Rule of law
Legality
Rule according to higher law

References

Theories of law
Analytic philosophy
Jurisprudence